Knefastia hilli is a species of sea snail, a marine gastropod mollusk in the family Pseudomelatomidae, the turrids and allies.

Description
The length of the shell varies between 35 mm and 58 mm.

Distribution
This species occurs in the Caribbean Sea off Panama.

References

 B. Landau and C. Marques da Silva. 2010. Early Pliocene gastropods of Cubagua, Venezuela: Taxonomy, palaeobiogeography and ecostratigraphy. Palaeontos 19:1-221

External links

 E. Petuch, A new Molluscan Faunule from the Caribbean Coast of Panama; The Nautilus v. 104 (1990); Bailey-Matthews Shell Museum, American Malacologists, Inc. Delaware Museum of Natural History.
 
 Gastropods.com: Knefastia hilli

hilli
Gastropods described in 1990